Maria Juur (born 15 March 1988), better known by her stage name Maria Minerva, is an Estonian musician and activist.

Maria Minerva is the recipient of two Estonian Music Awards. Her releases have received critical acclaim from music publications such as Pitchfork Media and The Fader. One of Maria Minerva's early supporters was the influential pop critic Simon Reynolds. She was named as one of the seminal Los Angeles artists by The Guardian and appeared on Estonian World's annual "Top 12 Most Outstanding Estonian Women in the World" list.

Maria graduated from the Estonian Academy of Arts and Goldsmiths, University of London, where she studied with British cultural theorist Mark Fisher. Her father Mart Juur is an Estonian humorist, writer and TV/radio personality.

Collaboration with Cherushii

Chelsea Faith a.k.a. Cherushii was one of the 36 victims of the 2016 Oakland warehouse fire. In 2019, the EP Cherushii & Maria Minerva was released, which had been nearly completed before Cherushii died and includes repurposed tracks from previous Cherushii releases.

Advocacy
Maria Minerva is a former member of the Estonian Greens political party and has expressed support for PÕXIT, the initiative calling for divestment from Estonia's primary energy source, oil shale.

Discography

 Sacred and Profane Love 12" EP (100% Silk, 2011)
 Cabaret Cixous CD/LP (Not Not Fun, 2011)
 Noble Savage 12" EP (100% Silk, 2011)
 Tallinn At Dawn CS (Not Not Fun, 2011)
 Nii hea with Ajukaja, 10" Single (Pudru Kuul, 2012)
 The Integration LP with LA Vampires (Not Not Fun, 2012)
 Will Happiness Find Me? CD/LP (Not Not Fun, 2012)
 Bless 12" EP (100% Silk, 2013)
 Histrionic LP (Not Not Fun, 2014)
 C U Again with Ajukaja, 12" EP (Pudru Kuul, 2014)
 S/T with Cherushii, 12" EP (100% Silk, 2019)
 Soft Power, CS (100% Silk, 2020)

References

External links 

1988 births
Living people
Estonian women musicians
Nu-disco musicians
Musicians from Tallinn
Women in electronic music
21st-century Estonian musicians
Tallinn French School alumni
Outsider house musicians